Perevoz is a rural locality (a village) in Belyankovsky Selsoviet, Belokataysky District, Bashkortostan, Russia. The population was 6 as of 2010. There are 2 streets.

Geography 
Perevoz is located 59 km northeast of Novobelokatay (the district's administrative centre) by road. Tashkinova is the nearest rural locality.

References 

Rural localities in Belokataysky District